Islington North by-election may refer to one of three by-elections held in the British House of Commons constituency of Islington North, in London:

 1937 Islington North by-election
 1958 Islington North by-election
 1969 Islington North by-election

See also
 Islington North constituency